This was the first edition of the tournament.

Tomáš Macháč won the title after defeating Zhang Zhizhen 1–6, 6–3, 6–2 in the final.

Seeds

Draw

Finals

Top half

Bottom half

References

External links
Main draw
Qualifying draw

Kozerki Open - 1